Günther's blind snake (Argyrophis bothriorhynchus) is a species of snake in the Typhlopidae family.

References

Argyrophis
Reptiles described in 1864
Taxa named by Albert Günther